Elpis may refer to:

 Elpis (mythology), Ancient Greek spirit of Hope
 Storm Elpis, Greek windstorm and blizzard in January 2022
 59 Elpis, a main-belt asteroid